Vladimir Igorevich Arnold (alternative spelling Arnol'd, 12 June 1937 – 3 June 2010) was a Soviet and Russian mathematician. While he is best known for the Kolmogorov–Arnold–Moser theorem regarding the stability of integrable systems, he made revolutionary and deep contributions in several areas including geometrical theory of dynamical systems theory, algebra, catastrophe theory, topology, algebraic geometry, symplectic geometry, symplectic topology, differential equations, classical mechanics, differential geometric approach to hydrodynamics, geometric analysis  and singularity theory,  including posing the ADE classification problem, since his first main result—the solution of Hilbert's thirteenth problem in 1957 at the age of 19. He co-founded two new branches of mathematics—KAM theory, and topological Galois theory (this, with his student Askold Khovanskii). He is widely regarded as one of greatest mathematicians of all time. 

Arnold was also known as a popularizer of mathematics. Through his lectures, seminars, and as the author of several textbooks (such as the famous Mathematical Methods of Classical Mechanics) and popular mathematics books, he influenced many mathematicians and physicists. Many of his books were translated into English. His views on education were particularly opposed to those of Bourbaki.

Biography
Vladimir Igorevich Arnold was born on 12 June 1937 in Odessa, Soviet Union (now Odesa, Ukraine). His father was Igor Vladimirovich Arnold (1900–1948), a mathematician. His mother was Nina Alexandrovna Arnold (1909–1986, née Isakovich), a Jewish art historian. While a school student, Arnold once asked his father on the reason why the multiplication of two negative numbers yielded a positive number, and his father provided an answer involving the field properties of real numbers and the preservation of the distributive property. Arnold was deeply disappointed with this answer, and developed an aversion to the axiomatic method that lasted through his life. When Arnold was thirteen, his uncle Nikolai B. Zhitkov, who was an engineer, told him about calculus and how it could be used to understand some physical phenomena, this contributed to spark his interest for mathematics, and he started to study by himself the mathematical books his father had left to him, which included some works of Leonhard Euler and Charles Hermite.

While a student of Andrey Kolmogorov at Moscow State University and still a teenager, Arnold showed in 1957 that any continuous function of several variables can be constructed with a finite number of two-variable functions, thereby solving Hilbert's thirteenth problem. This is the Kolmogorov–Arnold representation theorem.

After graduating from Moscow State University in 1959, he worked there until 1986 (a professor since 1965), and then at Steklov Mathematical Institute.

He became an academician of the Academy of Sciences of the Soviet Union (Russian Academy of Science since 1991) in 1990. Arnold can be said to have initiated the theory of symplectic topology as a distinct discipline. The Arnold conjecture on the number of fixed points of Hamiltonian symplectomorphisms and Lagrangian intersections were also a major motivation in the development of Floer homology.

In 1999 he suffered a serious bike accident in Paris, resulting in traumatic brain injury, and though he regained consciousness after a few weeks, he had amnesia and for some time could not even recognize his own wife at the hospital, but he went on to make a good recovery.

Arnold worked at the Steklov Mathematical Institute in Moscow and at Paris Dauphine University up until his death.  he was reported to have the highest citation index among Russian scientists, and h-index of 40. His students include Alexander Givental, Victor Goryunov, Sabir Gusein-Zade, Emil Horozov, Boris Khesin, Askold Khovanskii, Nikolay Nekhoroshev, Boris Shapiro, Alexander Varchenko, Victor Vassiliev and Vladimir Zakalyukin.

To his students and colleagues Arnold was known also for his sense of humour. For example, once at his seminar in Moscow, at the beginning of the school year, when he usually was formulating new problems, he said:

Death 
Arnold died of acute pancreatitis on 3 June 2010 in Paris, nine days before his 73rd birthday. He was buried on 15 June in Moscow, at the Novodevichy Monastery.

In a telegram to Arnold's family, Russian President Dmitry Medvedev stated:

Popular mathematical writings
Arnold is well known for his lucid writing style, combining mathematical rigour with physical intuition, and an easy conversational style of teaching and education. His writings present a fresh, often geometric approach to traditional mathematical topics like ordinary differential equations, and his many textbooks have proved influential in the development of new areas of mathematics. The standard criticism about Arnold's pedagogy is that his books "are beautiful treatments of their subjects that are appreciated by experts, but too many details are omitted for students to learn the mathematics required to prove the statements that he so effortlessly justifies." His defense was that his books are meant to teach the subject to "those who truly wish to understand it" (Chicone, 2007).

Arnold was an outspoken critic of the trend towards high levels of abstraction in mathematics during the middle of the last century. He had very strong opinions on how this approach—which was most popularly implemented by the Bourbaki school in France—initially had a negative impact on French mathematical education, and then later on that of other countries as well. Arnold was very interested in the history of mathematics. In an interview, he said he had learned much of what he knew about mathematics through the study of Felix Klein's book Development of Mathematics in the 19th Century —a book he often recommended to his students. He studied the classics, most notably the works of Huygens, Newton and Poincaré, and many times he reported to have found in their works ideas that had not been explored yet.

Work

Arnold worked on dynamical systems theory, catastrophe theory, topology, algebraic geometry, symplectic geometry, differential equations, classical mechanics, hydrodynamics and singularity theory. Michèle Audin described him as "a geometer in the widest possible sense of the word" and said that "he was very fast to make connections between different fields".

Hilbert's thirteenth problem 

The problem is the following question: can every continuous function of three variables be expressed as a composition of finitely many continuous functions of two variables?  The affirmative answer to this general question was given in 1957 by Vladimir Arnold, then only nineteen years old and a student of Andrey Kolmogorov. Kolmogorov had shown in the previous year that any function of several variables can be constructed with a finite number of three-variable functions. Arnold then expanded on this work to show that only two-variable functions were in fact required, thus answering the Hilbert's question when posed for the class of continuous functions.

Dynamical systems 

Moser and Arnold expanded the ideas of Kolmogorov (who was inspired by questions of Poincaré) and gave rise to what is now known as Kolmogorov–Arnold–Moser theorem (or "KAM theory"), which concerns the persistence of some quasi-periodic motions (nearly integrable Hamiltonian systems) when they are perturbed. KAM theory shows that, despite the perturbations, such systems can be stable over an infinite period of time, and specifies what the conditions for this are.

In 1964, Arnold introduced the Arnold web, the first example of a stochastic web.

Singularity theory
In 1965, Arnold attended René Thom's seminar on catastrophe theory. He later said of it: "I am deeply indebted to Thom, whose singularity seminar at the Institut des Hautes Etudes Scientifiques, which I frequented throughout the year 1965, profoundly changed my mathematical universe." After this event, singularity theory became one of the major interests of Arnold and his students. Among his most famous results in this area is his classification of simple singularities, contained in his paper "Normal forms of functions near degenerate critical points, the Weyl groups of Ak,Dk,Ek and Lagrangian singularities".

Fluid dynamics

In 1966, Arnold published "", in which he presented a common geometric interpretation for both the Euler's equations for rotating rigid bodies and the Euler's equations of fluid dynamics, this effectively linked topics previously thought to be unrelated, and enabled mathematical solutions to many questions related to fluid flows and their turbulence.

Real algebraic geometry
In the year 1971, Arnold published "On the arrangement of ovals of real plane algebraic curves, involutions of four-dimensional smooth manifolds, and the arithmetic of integral quadratic forms", which gave new life to real algebraic geometry. In it, he made major advances in the direction of a solution to Gudkov's conjecture, by finding a connection between it and four-dimensional topology. The conjecture was to be later fully solved by V. A. Rokhlin building on Arnold's work.

Symplectic geometry 
The Arnold conjecture, linking the number of fixed points of Hamiltonian symplectomorphisms and the topology of the subjacent manifolds, was the motivating source of many of the pioneer studies in symplectic topology.

Topology
According to Victor Vassiliev, Arnold "worked comparatively little on topology for topology's sake." And he was rather motivated by problems on other areas of mathematics where topology could be of use. His contributions include the invention of a topological form of the Abel–Ruffini theorem and the initial development of some of the consequent ideas, a work which resulted in the creation of the field of topological Galois theory in the 1960s.

Theory of plane curves 
According to Marcel Berger, Arnold revolutionized plane curves theory. Among his contributions are the Arnold invariants of plane curves.

Other 
Arnold conjectured the existence of the gömböc.

Honours and awards

 Lenin Prize (1965, with Andrey Kolmogorov), "for work on celestial mechanics."
 Crafoord Prize (1982, with Louis Nirenberg), "for contributions to the theory of non-linear differential equations."
 Elected member of the United States National Academy of Sciences in 1983).
 Foreign Honorary Member of the American Academy of Arts and Sciences (1987)
 Elected a Foreign Member of the Royal Society (ForMemRS) of London in 1988.
 Elected member of the American Philosophical Society in 1990.
 Lobachevsky Prize of the Russian Academy of Sciences (1992)
 Harvey Prize (1994), "for basic contribution to the stability theory of dynamical systems, his pioneering work on singularity theory and seminal contributions to analysis and geometry."
 Dannie Heineman Prize for Mathematical Physics (2001), "for his fundamental contributions to our understanding of dynamics and of singularities of maps with profound consequences for mechanics, astrophysics, statistical mechanics, hydrodynamics and optics."
 Wolf Prize in Mathematics (2001), "for his deep and influential work in a multitude of areas of mathematics, including dynamical systems, differential equations, and singularity theory."
 State Prize of the Russian Federation (2007), "for outstanding success in mathematics."
 Shaw Prize in mathematical sciences (2008, with Ludwig Faddeev), "for their contributions to mathematical physics."

The minor planet 10031 Vladarnolda was named after him in 1981 by Lyudmila Georgievna Karachkina.

The Arnold Mathematical Journal, published for the first time in 2015, is named after him.

The Arnold Fellowships, of the London Institute are named after him.

He was a plenary speaker at both the 1974 and 1983 International Congress of Mathematicians in Vancouver and Warsaw, respectively.

Fields Medal omission
Even though Arnold was nominated for the 1974 Fields Medal, which was then viewed as the highest honour a mathematician could receive, interference from the Soviet government led to it being withdrawn. Arnold's public opposition to the persecution of dissidents had led him into direct conflict with influential Soviet officials, and he suffered persecution himself, including not being allowed to leave the Soviet Union during most of the 1970s and 1980s.

Selected bibliography
 1966: 
 1978: Ordinary Differential Equations, The MIT Press .
 1985: 
 1988: 
 1988: 
 1989: 
 1989 
 1989: (with A. Avez) Ergodic Problems of Classical Mechanics, Addison-Wesley .
 1990: Huygens and Barrow, Newton and Hooke: Pioneers in mathematical analysis and catastrophe theory from evolvents to quasicrystals, Eric J.F. Primrose translator, Birkhäuser Verlag (1990) .
 1991: 
 1995:Topological Invariants of Plane Curves and Caustics, American Mathematical Society (1994) 
 1998: "On the teaching of mathematics" (Russian) Uspekhi Mat. Nauk 53 (1998), no. 1(319), 229–234; translation in Russian Math. Surveys 53(1): 229–236.
 1999: (with Valentin Afraimovich) Bifurcation Theory And Catastrophe Theory Springer 
 2001: "Tsepniye Drobi" (Continued Fractions, in Russian), Moscow (2001).
 2004: Teoriya Katastrof (Catastrophe Theory, in Russian), 4th ed. Moscow, Editorial-URSS (2004), .
 2004: 
 2004: 
 2007: Yesterday and Long Ago, Springer (2007), .
 2013: 
 2014: 
 2015: Experimental Mathematics. American Mathematical Society (translated from Russian, 2015).
 2015: Lectures and Problems: A Gift to Young Mathematicians, American Math Society, (translated from Russian, 2015)

Collected works
 2010: A. B. Givental; B. A. Khesin; J. E. Marsden; A. N. Varchenko; V. A. Vassilev; O. Ya. Viro; V. M. Zakalyukin (editors). Collected Works, Volume I: Representations of Functions, Celestial Mechanics, and KAM Theory (1957–1965). Springer
 2013: A. B. Givental; B. A. Khesin; A. N. Varchenko; V. A. Vassilev; O. Ya. Viro; (editors). Collected Works, Volume II: Hydrodynamics, Bifurcation Theory, and Algebraic Geometry (1965–1972). Springer.
 2016: Givental, A.B., Khesin, B., Sevryuk, M.B., Vassiliev, V.A., Viro, O.Y. (Eds.). Collected Works, Volume III: Singularity Theory 1972–1979. Springer.
 2018: Givental, A.B., Khesin, B., Sevryuk, M.B., Vassiliev, V.A., Viro, O.Y. (Eds.). Collected Works, Volume IV: Singularities in Symplectic and Contact Geometry 1980–1985. Springer.
 2022 (To be published, September 2022): Alexander B. Givental, Boris A. Khesin, Mikhail B. Sevryuk, Victor A. Vassiliev, Oleg Ya. Viro (Eds.). Collected Works, Volume VI: Dynamics, Combinatorics, and Invariants of Knots, Curves, and Wave Fronts 1992–1995. Springer.

See also

List of things named after Vladimir Arnold
Independent University of Moscow
Geometric mechanics

References

Further reading
 Khesin, Boris; Tabachnikov, Serge (Coordinating Editors). "Tribute to Vladimir Arnold", Notices of the American Mathematical Society, March 2012, Volume 59, Number 3, pp. 378–399.
 Khesin, Boris; Tabachnikov, Serge (Coordinating Editors). "Memories of Vladimir Arnold", Notices of the American Mathematical Society'', April 2012, Volume 59, Number 4, pp. 482–502.

External links

 V. I. Arnold's web page
 Personal web page
 V. I. Arnold lecturing on Continued Fractions
 A short curriculum vitae
 On Teaching Mathematics, text of a talk espousing Arnold's opinions on mathematical instruction
 Topology of Plane Curves, Wave Fronts, Legendrian Knots, Sturm Theory and Flattenings of Projective Curves
 Problems from 5 to 15, a text by Arnold for school students, available at the IMAGINARY platform
 
 S. Kutateladze, Arnold Is Gone
 В.Б.Демидовичем (2009), МЕХМАТЯНЕ ВСПОМИНАЮТ 2: В.И.Арнольд, pp. 25–58
 Author profile in the database zbMATH

1937 births
2010 deaths
Scientists from Odesa
20th-century Russian mathematicians
21st-century Russian mathematicians
Fellows of the American Academy of Arts and Sciences
Foreign Members of the Royal Society
Lenin Prize winners
Mathematical analysts
Full Members of the USSR Academy of Sciences
Full Members of the Russian Academy of Sciences
Members of the French Academy of Sciences
Foreign associates of the National Academy of Sciences
Moscow State University alumni
Soviet mathematicians
State Prize of the Russian Federation laureates
Topologists
Fluid dynamicists
Academic staff of the University of Paris
Wolf Prize in Mathematics laureates
Mathematical physicists
Russian mathematicians
Textbook writers
Geometers
Algebraic geometers
Differential geometers
Dynamical systems theorists
Newton scholars
Deaths from pancreatitis
Academic staff of Moscow State University
Academic staff of the Steklov Institute of Mathematics
Academic staff of the Independent University of Moscow
Members of the American Philosophical Society
Members of the German Academy of Sciences at Berlin
Algebraists
Odesa Jews